Lindsay Davis (born April 22, 1992) is an American former figure skater who has competed in both ladies' singles and pairs.  she skates with Rockne Brubaker.

Career 
Davis skated with Alexander Merritt and Themistocles Leftheris early in her pairs' career.

In May 2012, it was announced that she had teamed up with Mark Ladwig. Davis / Ladwig competed at two Grand Prix events and won the pewter medal at the 2013 U.S. Championships. They confirmed the end of their partnership on February 7, 2013.

On February 19, 2013, it was announced that Davis had teamed up with Rockne Brubaker.

Programs 
With Brubaker

With Ladwig

Results

Pairs
With Brubaker

With Ladwig

With Leftheris

With Merritt

Singles

References

External links
 
 Lindsay Davis at the U.S. Figure Skating Association
 
 
 Lindsay Davis / Themistocles Leftheris at the U.S. Figure Skating Association

American female single skaters
American female pair skaters
Living people
1992 births
21st-century American women
20th-century American women